Table Tennis at the 2001 Southeast Asian Games was held in TNB Pantai Kilat Hall, Kuala Lumpur, Malaysia from 9 to 16 September 2001  Tennis had team, doubles, and singles events for men and women, as well as a mixed doubles competition.

Medalists

Results

Men's team

Women's team

Men's singles

Women's singles

Men's doubles

Women's doubles

Mixed doubles

Medal table
Legend

References

External links
 

2001
Southeast Asian Games
Table tennis competitions in Malaysia
2001 Southeast Asian Games events
Kuala Lumpur